The New Standard is the fortieth album by jazz pianist Herbie Hancock, released in 1996 on Verve. It consists of jazz renditions of classic and contemporaneous rock and R&B songs. It features an all-star sextet with saxophonist Michael Brecker, guitarist John Scofield, bassist Dave Holland, percussionist Don Alias and drummer Jack DeJohnette.

Track listing
"New York Minute" (Don Henley, Danny Kortchmar, Kai Winding) - 8:35
"Mercy Street" (Peter Gabriel) - 8:36
"Norwegian Wood (This Bird Has Flown)" (John Lennon, Paul McCartney) - 8:07
"When Can I See You" (Kenny "Babyface" Edmonds) - 6:17
"You've Got It Bad Girl" (Stevie Wonder, Yvonne Wright) - 7:15
"Love Is Stronger Than Pride" (Sade Adu, Andrew Hale, Stuart Matthewman) - 8:00
"Scarborough Fair" (Traditional) - 8:24
"Thieves in the Temple" (Prince) - 7:33
"All Apologies" (Kurt Cobain) - 5:08
"Manhattan (Island of Lights and Love)" (Herbie Hancock, Jean Hancock) - 4:06
"Your Gold Teeth II" (Donald Fagen, Walter Becker) - 5:14

Personnel
 Herbie Hancock - piano
 Michael Brecker - tenor and soprano saxophone
 John Scofield - acoustic and electric guitar, electric sitar
 Dave Holland - acoustic bass
 Jack DeJohnette - drums, electric percussion
 Don Alias - percussion

References

1996 albums
Herbie Hancock albums
John Scofield albums
Verve Records albums